Galina Talva, a ballet dancer, was born in the Bronx, to a Russian émigré. She appeared in Crime and Punishment on Broadway with John Gielgud. She played Princess Maria in Irving Berlin's Call Me Madam, a Broadway musical comedy (1950), and sings on the original cast recording.

In 1953, she married Leon Volkov, a Soviet Russian Air Force colonel, who defected to the U.S.A. Thereafter, she did little or no stage work. Volkov went on to become Newsweek magazine's Soviet affairs specialist.  He died in January 1974.

References

American ballerinas
People from the Bronx
Year of birth missing